The Myrmecophilidae or ant-loving crickets are rarely encountered relatives of mole crickets, and are obligate inquilines within ant nests. They are very small, wingless, and flattened, so resemble small cockroach nymphs. The few genera contain fewer than 100 species. Ant crickets are yellow, brown, or nearly black in color. They do not produce sound, and lack both wings and tympanal organs ("ears") on the front tibia.

Tribes and genera
The Orthoptera Species File lists two subfamilies:

Bothriophylacinae
Auth.: Miram, 1934; distribution: northern Africa, western Asia
 tribe Bothriophylacini Miram, 1934
Bothriophylax Miram, 1934
Eremogryllodes Chopard, 1929
 tribe Microbothriophylacini Gorochov, 2017
Microbothriophylax Gorochov, 1993

Myrmecophilinae
Auth.: Saussure, 1874; distribution: global
 tribe Myrmecophilini Saussure, 1874
Myrmecophilus Berthold, 1827
Myrmecophilellus Uvarov, 1940
 Incertae sedis
 †Araripemyrmecophilops Martins-Neto, 1991
 Camponophilus Ingrisch, 1995

References

External links

Ensifera
Extant Jurassic first appearances